The Celier Xenon 2 (also referred to by the manufacturer as the Xenon II) is a series of Polish autogyros that was designed by Frenchman Raphael Celier and produced by his company, Celier Aviation of Piotrków Trybunalski, Poland. The aircraft is supplied as a kit for amateur construction or as a complete ready-to-fly-aircraft.

Production of the Xenon 2 has ended and only the Celier Xenon 4 model remained in production is 2017.

Design and development
The side-by-side configuration Xenon 2 complements the tandem seat Celier Kiss series of autogyros. The Xenon 2 series all feature a single main rotor, tricycle landing gear, a low-set twin-boom T-tail, a fully enclosed two seat cockpit and a choice of engines, all mounted in pusher configuration.

One hundred Xenon 2s had been completed by 2011. The design has been developed into the three seat Celier Xenon 3 and Xenon 4.

Variants
Xenon 2 RT
Turbocharged model, powered by a four cylinder, air and liquid-cooled, four-stroke, dual-ignition  Rotax 914 engine in pusher configuration.
Xenon 2R Eco
Model powered by a four cylinder, air and liquid-cooled, four-stroke, dual-ignition  Rotax 912ULS engine in pusher configuration.
Xenon 2 Executive
Upgraded turbocharged model, powered by a four cylinder, air and liquid-cooled, four-stroke, dual-ignition  Rotax 914 engine in pusher configuration. The aircraft has many upgrades and optional equipment as standard, including a Mitsubishi turbocharger that boosts the engine power output.
Xenon 3
Development version
Xenon 4
Further refined three-seat version

Specifications (Xenon 2 RT)

References

External links

X
2000s Polish sport aircraft
Homebuilt aircraft
Single-engined pusher autogyros
Twin-boom aircraft